Oslo Militære Samfund ("Oslo Military Society") is a Norwegian society of military commissioned officers founded in 1825.

The society has published the magazine Norsk Militært Tidsskrift since 1835. Its location at Myntgt. 3 in Oslo was built in 1878, and designed by architect Wilhelm von Hanno.

References

1825 establishments in Norway
Organizations established in 1825
Organisations based in Oslo
Clubs and societies in Norway
Military clubs and societies
Military of Norway